Lavazza A Modo Mio is a range of coffee capsules and machines produced by Lavazza since 2007. The A Modo Mio range is aimed at domestic use and supports the "Lavazza Blue" range of capsules designed for the business target. 

The main competitors are Nescafè Dolce Gusto, Illy IperEspresso and the Nespresso capsule range.

History 
Officially launched in 2007, the A Modo Mio family is composed of a range of single-dose coffee capsules and related series of coffee machines developed by Lavazza and Saeco and produced by Saeco in Italy. The system is designed to remedy the defects of coffee pods which, if not correctly inserted, cause water leakage and alteration of the drink. In contrast to the institutionally-marketed Lavazza Blue pods, the A Modo Mio pods are sold in supermarkets.

Lavazza made an agreement with the Seico to produce coffee machines compatible only with the A Modo Mio system. It invested  for the A Modo Mio system and 6 million euro  for advertising and marketing. The capsules are produced at the Mokapak factory in Gattinara, in the province of Vercelli, where the "Lavazza Blue" capsules are also produced.

In 2007 the first two coffee machines called "Saeco Extra" and "Saeco Premium" were launched, as well as the first range of capsules in four different flavors. Each package contained 16 capsules at a price of  5.49 euro, equal to about 0.34 euro per capsule.

After the launch, Lavazza continued with the expansion of both the range of capsules and the range of coffee machines. 2010 saw the introduction of the “Lavazza Piccina”, produced by Saeco. It had a more compact size, removable capsule collection tank, and steam nozzle.

In 2015 Lavazza introduced the A Modo Mio Fantasia coffee machine designed together with Electrolux. Fantasia has both short and long coffee modes and a milk editor.

See also  
 Single-serve coffee container

References

External links

A Modo Mio Lavazza: a casa come al bar

Coffee preparation
Lavazza